Project 2000 was a higher education scheme in the United Kingdom for nursing qualifications, introduced in 1990 by the United Kingdom Central Council for Nursing, Midwifery and Health Visiting (UKCC), later the Nursing and Midwifery Council (NMC).

History
Methods and procedures in nursing were becoming more knowledge-led. Instead of the former apprenticeship system, whereby nurses were trained at hospitals, the Project 2000 scheme was to contract the training of nurses out to British universities.

State Enrolled Nurses (SENs) previously had two years of training.

State Registered Nurses (SRNs) were fully qualified nurses before 1990.

Implementation
Project 2000 was phased in as the primary choice for nurse training from 1990. Prior to then the government was spending around £770m on nurse training. Only around £71m was spent in 1991-92 on its implementation, when 14 Colleges of Nursing were added to the scheme. When the scheme began, universities did not charge any tuition fees and students were paid a bursary to support their living and training costs during the course.

The scheme was implemented by the United Kingdom Central Council for Nursing, Midwifery and Health Visiting (UKCC), itself created in 1983, which became the Nursing and Midwifery Council (NMC) in 2002.

State Registered Nurses became Registered General Nurses (RGNs).

State Enrolled Nurses were replaced with healthcare assistants, who had no official training and were neither registered.

Training
Project 2000 student nurses studied for 3 years, splitting the time between class based learning, and practical placements. The first 18-month of the course was known as the common foundation programme and provided basic grounding in 4 nursing discipline: Adult, Child, Mental Health and Learning Disability care. This was followed by 18 months dedicated to the nursing discipline of choice. On successful completion of the course students were awarded a Diploma in Nursing relevant to their discipline.

See also
 :Category:Acts of the Parliament of the United Kingdom concerning healthcare
 Timeline of tuition fees in the United Kingdom

References
 Project 2000, UKCC: A new preparation for practice, 1 January 1986, 

1990 establishments in the United Kingdom
Medical education in the United Kingdom
Midwifery in the United Kingdom
Nursing credentials and certifications
Nursing education in the United Kingdom
Nursing in the United Kingdom
Universities in the United Kingdom